The Flettner Gigant was an experimental helicopter built in Germany during the early 1930s.

Design and development
Anton Flettner was an early rotary-wing pioneer in Germany, he developed a torqueless rotor by powering it with small engines fixed directly to the blades driving propellers. this arrangement drove the rotor without transmitting torque (other than bearing friction) to the fuselage.

A successful tethered flight was carried out in 1932, but the aircraft was destroyed soon afterwards when it overturned in a gale.

Specifications (variant specified)

See also

References

Gigant
Twin-engined piston helicopters
1930s German experimental aircraft
1930s German helicopters
Aircraft first flown in 1932